To distort is to alter the original shape of an object, image, sound, waveform or other form of information or representation.

Distort may also refer to:

 Distort (album), a 1998 industrial album by Collide
 Distort Entertainment, a record label

See also

 Distortion (disambiguation)